Southern Park is the name of:

Southern Park F.C., South African soccer club
Southern Park Mall, shopping mall in Boardman, Ohio
Southern National Park, national park in South Sudan
Southern Park, Tampere, a park in Tampere, Finland